The 1981 Volta a Catalunya was the 61st edition of the Volta a Catalunya cycle race and was held from 3 September to 10 September 1981. The race started in Platja d'Aro and finished at Manresa. The race was won by Faustino Rupérez of the Zor team.

General classification

References

1981
Volta
1981 in Spanish road cycling
September 1981 sports events in Europe